Benzo[c]cinnoline is a tricyclic organic compound with the formula C12H8N2. Formally this species is derived by oxidative dehydrogenation of 2,2'-diaminobiphenyl. This heterocycle reacts with iron carbonyls to form C12H8N2Fe2(CO)6.

See also 
 Cinnoline

References 

Aromatic nitrogen heterocycles
Phenanthrolines